The Laestadian church arrived in North America with Nordic (especially Finnish and Sami) immigrants in the latter half of the 19th century, many of whom came to work in the copper mines of the Keweenaw Peninsula. Some of these new immigrants found themselves in conflict with older, established immigrants from the same countries, being generally poorer and less established, and hewing to the new, fundamentalist teachings of Lars Levi Laestadius, a Swedish-Sami preacher and botanist born in Arjeplog, Sweden. Laestadian congregations separate from the extant Scandinavian Lutheran churches were formed in Cokato, Minnesota, in 1872 and in Calumet, Michigan, in 1873.

Groups in the Americas in 2013
There are a total of 171,000 Laestadians in the world, with 26,000 of these being based in the Americas.
 Firstborn laestadianism ("Esikoinens") – 10,000 members in the United States (Old Apostolic Lutheran Church)
 Little firstborn group – (Rauhan Sana group) (Federation) ("Mickelsons") 6,000 members in the United States and Canada (Apostolic Lutheran Church of America), and in Guatemala
 Conservative laestadianism – ("Heidemans") 5,000 members in the United States and Canada (Laestadian Lutheran Church), and in Ecuador
 Torola group – 4,000 members in the United States (First Apostolic Lutheran Church)
 Reedites (pollarites) – 3,500 members in the United States (Independent Apostolic Lutheran Church)
 Aunesites – 550 members in the United States (The Apostolic Lutheran Church)
 Grace Apostolic Lutheran Church – about 200 members in South Carolina
 Davidites – 40 members in the United States
 Melvinites – 20 members in the United States

Terminology
Each congregation generally has a name they call themselves, which frequently differs from the name used in this article. In particular, First Apostolic adherents would recoil at being labelled "Laestadian" because for them, "Laestadians" are the opposing side of the 1973 schism. In the interest of editorial clarity, this article uses an internally consistent naming scheme which differs from the names congregations apply to themselves. The term "Laestadian" is used as an umbrella to refer to all churches with a clear succession of belief from the teachings of Lars Levi Laestadius. The respective branches of Laestadian churches recognize their roots with the teachings of Lars Levi Laestadius to varying degrees. The Old Apostolic Lutheran Church, for example, will read a postilla (sermon) of Laestadius along with a text from the Bible with every church service. In contrast, the Pollari congregations do not recognize Laestadius in any of their liturgy and he is not given any special emphasis in their teachings.

The term "Apostolic" does not refer to the doctrine of apostolic succession; rather, it denotes an effort to live as near as possible in the Laestadian view to the Apostle's doctrines and practices.

Congregations and concentrations
As of 2017, significant concentrations of Laestadian adherents and churches which can trace their roots to Laestadianism exist in the following locales:

United States

 The Mat-Su Valley, Alaska
 Phoenix, Arizona
 Prescott, Arizona
 Hemet, California
 Martinez, California
 Glenwood Springs, Colorado
 Bethel, Connecticut
 Lake Worth, Florida
 Waukegan and Zion, Illinois
 Elkton, Maryland
 Centerville, Massachusetts
 Fitchburg, Massachusetts
 Calumet, Hancock, Houghton, and nearby towns in Michigan (the "Copper Country")
 Brighton, Michigan
 Howell, Michigan
 Ironwood, Michigan
 Iron River, Michigan
 Eben Junction, Michigan
 Negaunee and Ishpeming, Michigan
 Minneapolis, Minnesota (northwestern suburbs)
 Brainerd, Minnesota
 Cokato, Minnesota
 Dayton, Minnesota (northwest Minneapolis exurb)
 Deer River, Minnesota
 Duluth and Cloquet, Minnesota
 Eagle Lake Township, Minnesota
 Elk River, Minnesota
 Esko, Minnesota
 Floodwood, Minnesota
 Menahga, Minnesota and surrounding area
 New York Mills, Minnesota
 Rockford, Minnesota
 Virginia, Minnesota
 Kalispell, Montana
 New Ipswich, New Hampshire
 New York City (though small but has a community)
 High Point, North Carolina
 Dickinson, North Dakota
 Portland, Oregon
 Greer, South Carolina
 Hamlin County, South Dakota
 Utah County, Utah (primarily south of Provo, Utah)
 Greenbrier, Tennessee
 Battle Ground, Washington
 Davenport, Washington
 Longview, Washington
 Seattle, Washington (northwestern suburbs)
 Colville, Washington
 Spokane, Washington
 Marengo, Wisconsin
 Kenosha, Wisconsin
 Oulu, Wisconsin
 Wilmington, North Carolina

Canada

 Lethbridge, Alberta
 Vanderhoof, British Columbia
 Vancouver, British Columbia
 Winnipeg, Manitoba
 Sault Ste. Marie, Ontario
 Toronto, Ontario
 Outlook, Saskatchewan
 Dunblane, Saskatchewan
 Saskatoon, Saskatchewan
 Regina, Saskatchewan

Beliefs and characteristics
American Laestadians practice varied degrees of fundamentalist Christian belief. Most Laestadians avoid alcohol; varying numbers of adherents avoid a number of "worldly" practices, including dancing, card-playing, cinema, television, popular music, and the performing arts (listed in approximate order of avoidance). However, caffeine is widely consumed and tobacco is generally tolerated, but preached against when under 18 as most jurisdictions have laws against minors purchasing tobacco products. Family size tends to be large compared to the American average; most families in non-urban congregations have between 4 and 10 children, while most churches have a few families with 12 or 15 children. Birth control is generally not practiced; it is preached as sin unless after consideration and counsel with medical doctors it is determined to be necessary for the health of the mother. Birth control is not tolerated because it prevents a child from being born and each child is a gift from God.

Laestadian asceticism is distinguished from other American fundamentalist Christians in that none of the above-mentioned pastimes is officially proscribed; rather, Laestadians counsel each other and employ a reinforcing system of social feedback to encourage abstention. Active congregations provide social outlets in keeping with the beliefs of the church; nearly every weekend evening will find Laestadian teenagers congregating at one or another's home (get-togethers), preferably with adults present.

Laestadian churches, in keeping with the Holy Bible, teach that every human is a sinner and that every sin can be forgiven; forgiveness stems from the hearts of Laestadians, not from ceremony or hierarchy. Some Laestadians practice lay confession, whereby a member confesses to another member; in the Heidemanian tradition, some vestige of this practice remains in the liturgy but confession is not widely practiced.

Some Laestadian congregations consider themselves the one, true Christian church, and preach that all other Christian churches (including other branches of the Laestadian tradition) are not true Christians.

Ceremony and service in the Heidemanian tradition
In any case, a Laestadian may request to receive Communion in Finnish; another lay member of the congregation can deliver Communion if the pastor is not fluent. Communion is the only regularly practiced ceremony (performed once or twice a month, or every week, depending on the congregation), and consists of unleavened wafers and wine (sometimes grape juice), delivered assembly-line fashion at a communion rail at the conclusion of Sunday services.

Teenagers undergo Confirmation around age 13 to 15, after which they are eligible for communion. Other significant life ceremonies are baptism (performed during the first months of life, and rarely for adult converts) and marriage.

The Old Apostolic Lutheran congregations hold annual Elders' Meetings, often combined with St. John's summer services, several days to one week long, with guest preachers delivering evening sermons each weekday and two or more church services on the bracketing Sundays. Elders (senior preachers) from Lapland are invited to teach. Many church members follow the elders as they travel across America visiting different congregations. Other Apostolic Lutheran bodies hold similar "big services," in which members of multiple congregations gather in one location to hear speakers from the United States and from Scandinavia (if they have a cooperating European counterpart).

Sources

Notes

Further reading

External links
 Video archives of Jouko Talonen's lecture on Laestadius (in Finnish), October 4–5, 2012 in Oulu, Finland
 Chronology information
 Comprehensive listing of historical and current Finnish churches in North America ( dead link)
 Comprehensive listing of active congregations of all churches calling themselves "Apostolic"
 Official website of the Laestadian Lutheran Church
 History of how a botanist became the founder of a church, the Story of Lars Levi Laestadius
 History and books about the history of the movement in Lapland and the effect on the immigrants to the US
 Thesis regarding social problems within the church from Department of Psychology University of Joensuu, Finland
 Laestadius' sermons in text and audio files in English, Swedish, and Finnish
 A history of the Laestadian Lutheran Church, including its various beliefs and practices

Finnish-American culture
Finnish-American history
Sámi-American history
Upper Peninsula of Michigan
Lutheran denominations established in the 19th century
Religious organizations established in 1873
Finnish-American culture in Michigan